STS-67 was a human spaceflight mission using  that launched from Kennedy Space Center, Florida on 2 March 1995.

Crew

Mission highlights

Ultraviolet Imaging Experiments 

Astro-2 was the second dedicated Spacelab mission to conduct astronomical observations in the ultraviolet spectral regions (the first was the Astro-1 mission flown on STS-35).  The Astro-2 Spacelab consisted of three unique instruments – the Hopkins Ultraviolet Telescope (HUT), the Ultraviolet Imaging Telescope (UIT) and the Wisconsin Ultraviolet Photo-Polarimeter Experiment (WUPPE). These took measurements from objects within the solar system as well as individual stars, nebulae, supernova remnants, galaxies and active extragalactic objects. The data supplemented the data obtained from the Astro-1 mission.

The purpose of the UIT was to observe UV radiation from space (most UV radiation is absorbed by Earth's atmosphere and cannot be studied from the ground). The data collected from UIT Astro-1 mission provided the first accurate knowledge of UV data from the universe. The UIT in the Astro-2 Spacelab was capable of capturing almost twice the UV spectrum of its predecessor. As STS-67 launched at a different time of year from STS-35, data was collected from portions of the sky that Astro-1 was not able to view.

Middeck Active Control Experiment (MACE) 

On the Middeck, science experiments included the Protein Crystal Growth Thermal Enclosure System Vapor Diffusion Apparatus-03 experiment (PCG-TES-03), the Protein Crystal Growth Single Thermal Enclosure System-02 (PCG-STES-02), the Shuttle Amateur Radio Experiment-II (SAREX-II), the Middeck Active Control Experiment (MACE), the Commercial Materials Dispersion Apparatus Instrumentation Technology Associates Experiments-03 (CMIX-03) and the Midcourse Space Experiment (MSX).

The Middeck Active Control Experiment (MACE) was a space engineering research payload and activity. It consisted of a rate gyro, reaction wheels, a precision pointing payload, and a scanning and pointing payload that produces motion disturbances. The goal of the experiment was to test a closed loop control system that could compensate for motion disturbances. On orbit, Commander Stephen S. Oswald and Pilot William G. Gregory used MACE to test about 200 different motion disturbance situations over 45 hours of testing during the mission. Information from MACE was to be used to design better control systems that compensate for motion in future spacecraft.

Getaway Special Payloads 

Two Get Away Special (GAS) payloads were also on board. They were the G-387 and G-388 canisters. This experiment was sponsored by the Australian Space Office and AUSPACE ltd. The objectives were to make ultraviolet observations of deep space or nearby galaxies. These observations were made to study the structure of galactic supernova remnants, the distribution of hot gas in the Magellanic Clouds, the hot galactic halo emission, and emission associated with galactic cooling flows and jets. The two GAS canisters were interconnected with a cable. Canister 1 had a motorized door assembly that exposed a UV telescope to space when opened. UV reflective filters on the telescopes optics determine its UV bandpass. Canister 2 contained two video recorders for data storage and batteries to provide experiment power. It was Space Shuttle Endeavour's longest flight.

Mission insignia
The spiral galaxy, Jupiter, and the four moons (total of six space objects) as well as the seven stars of the insignia symbolize the flight's numerical designation in the Space Transportation System's mission sequence. Endeavour, with ASTRO-2, is speeding by.

See also

 List of human spaceflights
 List of Space Shuttle missions
 Outline of space science
 Space Shuttle
STS-80 (17 day 8 hour Shuttle mission)
STS-78 (16 day 21 hour Shuttle mission)
STS-73 (15 days 21 hours Shuttle mission)

References

External links
 NASA mission summary 
 STS-67 Video Highlights 
 Ultraviolet Imaging Telescope
 Wisconsin Ultraviolet Photo-Polarimeter Experiment
 Middeck Active Control Experiment
 R. R. Jayroe Collection, The University of Alabama in Huntsville Archives and Special Collections Files of Robert R. Jayroe, mission manager for Astro-2.

Space Shuttle missions
Edwards Air Force Base
Spacecraft launched in 1995
Crewed space observatories
Ultraviolet telescopes